Lucie Manhartová (born 14 May 1991) is a Czech ice hockey player and captain of HC Příbram in the Czech Women's Extraliga. She has previously played in the Elite Women's Hockey League (EWHL) with HC Slavia Praha, the NCAA Division III with the Norwich Cadets women's ice hockey program, the Russian Women's Hockey League (RWHL) with Biryusa Krasnoyarsk, and the Swedish Women's Hockey League (SDHL; previously ) with SDE Hockey and Sundsvall/Timrå.

As a member of the Czech national team, she participated in the Top Division tournaments of the IIHF Women's World Championship in 2013, 2016, and 2017; the Division I Group A tournaments in 2012, 2014, and 2015; the Division I tournaments in 2008 and 2009; and the Division II tournament in 2011.

Awards and honors
2017 Ball Hockey World Championship All-Tournament Team Selection
2019 Ball Hockey World Championship All-Tournament Team Selection

References

External links
 

1991 births
Living people
Biryusa Krasnoyarsk players
Czech expatriate ice hockey players in Russia
Czech expatriate ice hockey players in Sweden
Czech expatriate ice hockey players in the United States
Czech women's ice hockey forwards
SDE Hockey players
Ice hockey people from Prague
European Women's Hockey League players